BBS may refer to:

Ammunition
 BBs, BB gun metal bullets
 BBs, airsoft gun plastic pellets

Computing and gaming
 Bulletin board system, a computer server users dial into via dial-up or telnet; precursor to the Internet
 BIOS Boot Specification, a firmware specification for the boot process
 Blum Blum Shub, a pseudorandom number generator
 Kingdom Hearts Birth by Sleep, a Disney-based video game for the PlayStation Portable

Organisations

United Kingdom
 Birmingham Business School (University of Birmingham), a faculty
 British Blind Sport, a parasports charity
 British Boy Scouts, a national youth association
 British Bryological Society, a botanists' learned society

United States
 BBS Productions, a film company of early 1970s New Hollywood
 Badger Boys State, a youth camp held in Wisconsin

Elsewhere
 BBS Kraftfahrzeugtechnik, a German wheel manufacturer
 Bahrain Bayan School
 Bangladesh Bureau of Statistics
 Baton Broadcast System, Canada
 Bhutan Broadcasting Service, Bhutan
 Bodu Bala Sena, Sri Lanka
 Bologna Business School, Italy
 Budapest Business School, Hungary

Science
 Bardet–Biedl syndrome, a genetic disorder
 Behavioral and Brain Sciences, a peer-reviewed journal
 Behavior-based safety, the risk reduction subfield of behavioural engineering
 Berg Balance Scale, a medical function test
 Bogart–Bacall syndrome, a vocal misuse disorder
 Borate buffered saline, in biochemistry
 Breeding bird survey, to monitor avian populations

Titles
 Bachelor of Business Studies, an academic degree
 Bronze Bauhinia Star, in the Hong Kong honors system

Train stations
 Bhubaneswar railway station, Odisha, India (by Indian Railways code)
 Bras Basah MRT station, Singapore (by MRT abbreviation)